Adam Biro is founder of the art book publishing house Biro Éditeur in Paris and the author of nine books. Biro served as manager of Biro Éditeur until 2009, when the position passed to Stéphane Cohen. As of 2010, Biro continued to serve as an editorial advisor. Biro was born in Hungary, but left for Paris at the age of fifteen.

List of works 

Is It Good for the Jews?: More Stories from the Old Country and the New by Adam Biro, Translated by Catherine Tihanyi (Chicago, IL: University of Chicago Press, 2009)
One Must Also Be Hungarian by Adam Biro, Translated by Catherine Tihanyi (Chicago, IL: University of Chicago Press, 2006)
Two Jews on a Train: Stories from the Old Country and the New by Adam Biro, Translated by Catherine Tihanyi (Chicago, IL: University of Chicago Press, 2001)

References

Book reviews
Review, One Must Also Be Hungarian
Review, One Must Also Be Hungarian

External links 
 An excerpt from One Must Also Be Hungarian
 A story from Two Jews on a Train: Stories from the Old Country and the New

Living people
Hungarian Jews
Hungarian emigrants to France
Year of birth missing (living people)
Writers from Paris